The USRA Light Mikado was a USRA standard class of steam locomotive designed under the control of the United States Railroad Administration, the nationalized railroad system in the United States during World War I.  This was the standard light freight locomotive of the USRA types, and was of 2-8-2 wheel arrangement in the Whyte notation, or 1′D1′ in UIC classification.

A total of 625 locomotives were built under the auspices of the USRA, with a further 641 copies built after the end of the USRA's control.  The first, for the Baltimore and Ohio Railroad, was completed in July 1918 and given #4500.  The locomotives were considered well designed and modern, and were popular and successful.  Large numbers remained in service until replaced by diesel locomotives.  It was also called the McAdoo Mikado after William Gibbs McAdoo, head of the USRA.

With later copies, over 50 railroads used the type, including the following:

Copies:

Preservation
Nine USRA Light Mikados both originals and copies are preserved. These are Frisco 4003 at the Fort Smith Trolley Museum in Fort Smith, Arkansas, Frisco 4018 at the Sloss Furness in Birmingham, Alabama, Nickel Plate Road 587 at the Indiana Transportation Museum in Noblesville, Indiana, Nickel Plate Road 624 at Hammond, Indiana, but is now being relocated to Headwaters Junction, Nickel Plate Road 639 in Miller Park at Bloomington, Illinois, Baltimore and Ohio 4500 at the B&O Railroad Museum in Baltimore, Maryland, Grand Trunk Western 4070 at Midwest Railway Preservation Society in Cleveland, Ohio, Union Pacific 2537 at Jefferson Park in Walla Walla, Washington, and C&IM 551 at the St. Louis Transportation Museum.

References

Bibliography

USRA locomotives
2-8-2 locomotives
ALCO locomotives
Baldwin locomotives
Lima locomotives
Freight locomotives
Standard gauge locomotives of the United States
Standard gauge locomotives of Canada
Railway locomotives introduced in 1918